The Wight Shipyard is a shipbuilding company and shipyard based in East Cowes on the Isle of Wight in the UK, with their facilities occupying and including the historic Saunders-Roe flying boat hangar. The company was originally known as Shemara Refit LLP, and was formed to undertake the refit of the historic MY Shemara. They now specialise in the construction and refit of high speed craft and aluminium ships.

Ships built

Ships refitted
Thames Clippers ferries
Sky Clipper
Star Clipper
Storm Clipper
Red Funnel ferries
MV Red Eagle (In conjunction with Southampton Marine Services)

References

External links 

 

Companies based on the Isle of Wight
Shipbuilding companies of England
Shipyards of England